Robert Tufts (born 1955) is an American former baseball pitcher.

Robert Tufts may also refer to:

 Robert Tufts (politician) (born 2009), American mayor of Dorset, Minnesota 
Robert Tufts, co-writer NSC 68

See also
 Tufts (surname)
 Robert (disambiguation)